Treponema primitia is a bacterium, the first termite gut spirochete to be isolated, together with Treponema azotonutricium.

References

Further reading
Maier, Raina M., Ian L. Pepper, and Charles P. Gerba, eds. Environmental microbiology. Vol. 397. Academic press, 2009.
Berlanga, Mercedes. "Pathogenic Treponema. Molecular and cellular biology."International Microbiology 10.1 (2010): 72.

External links

LPSN

primitia
Bacteria described in 2004